Likpe or Sekpele (also Bosele, Mu) is spoken in the mountainous central part of the Volta Region of Ghana. It belongs to the geographic group of Ghana Togo Mountain languages (traditionally called the Togorestsprachen or Togo Remnant languages) of the Kwa branch of Niger–Congo.

References

External links 
 ELAR archive of Description and Documentation of Sekpele

Languages of Ghana
Ghana–Togo Mountain languages